The 2014–15 Serbian League East season. It began on 16 August 2014 and ended on 7 June 2015. Serbian League East is one of four Serbian league in football, which is the third level of football contest in Serbia . League consists of 16 teams . A higher level of competition is the First League , while the lower three Zone League - West , East and South.

Clubs 2014–15

Teams and Stadiums

League table

External links
 Srbijasport at srbijasport.net
 Aktuelnosti FSRIS at fsris.org.rs

Serbian League East seasons
3
Serb